Phil Abramson (March 13, 1933 – July 5, 1987) was an American set decorator. He was nominated for an Academy Award in the category Best Art Direction for the film Close Encounters of the Third Kind.

Selected filmography
 Close Encounters of the Third Kind (1977)

References

External links

1933 births
1987 deaths
Artists from Omaha, Nebraska
American set decorators